Nathalie Tauziat was the defending champion, but chose not to participate this year.

Jelena Dokić won the title, defeating Anastasia Myskina in the final 6–2, 6–3.

Seeds
A champion seed is indicated in bold text while text in italics indicates the round in which that seed was eliminated. The top eight seeds received a bye to the second round.

  Jelena Dokić (champion)
  Sandrine Testud (third round)
  Magdalena Maleeva (quarterfinals)
  Tamarine Tanasugarn (second round)
  Tatiana Panova (second round)
  Anastasia Myskina (final)
  Anne Kremer (quarterfinals)
  Lisa Raymond (semifinals)
  Dája Bedáňová (third round)
  Alexandra Stevenson (third round)
  Ai Sugiyama (third round)
  Rita Grande (second round)
  Magüi Serna (second round)
  Nicole Pratt (semifinals)
  Adriana Serra Zanetti (first round)
  Elena Likhovtseva (third round)

Draw

Finals

Top half

Section 1

Section 2

Bottom half

Section 3

Section 4

External links
 2002 DFS Classic draw

DFS Classic Singles
Singles